The 2016 Ford EcoBoost 400 was a NASCAR Sprint Cup Series race held on November 20, 2016, at Homestead-Miami Speedway in Homestead, Florida. Contested over 268 laps – extended from 267 laps due to an overtime finish, on the 1.5 mile (2.4 km) oval, it was the 36th and final race of the 2016 NASCAR Sprint Cup Series season. Jimmie Johnson won the race, and with it his seventh career Cup championship, tying him with Dale Earnhardt and Richard Petty for the most Cup Series championships of all time.

It also marked the final race for Sprint as the series sponsor, having been the Cup Series’ title sponsor since 2008, after buying out Nextel in late 2005. Monster Energy replaced Sprint as title sponsor for the series for 2017.

This was the final race for three-time champion and Hall of Fame inductee Tony Stewart. It was also the final race for Carl Edwards.

Report

Tony Stewart's final race
The race marked the final start of three-time Sprint Cup Champion Tony Stewart after a farewell tour (of which he missed the first nine races due to a Non-NASCAR racing accident), which took place a year after that of Jeff Gordon. Despite missing the first nine races due to a non-NASCAR racing accident, Stewart made the Chase with a win at Sonoma, but was eliminated in the first round. He started this race 11th, but finished 22nd.

Background

Homestead-Miami Speedway is a motor racing track located in Homestead, Florida. The track, which has several configurations, has promoted several series of racing, including NASCAR, the Verizon IndyCar Series, the Grand-Am Rolex Sports Car Series and the Championship Cup Series.

From 2002 until 2020, Homestead-Miami Speedway hosted the final race of the season in all three of NASCAR's series: the Sprint Cup Series, Xfinity Series and Camping World Truck Series. Ford Motor Company sponsored all three of the season-ending races; the races have the names Ford EcoBoost 400, Ford EcoBoost 300 and Ford EcoBoost 200, respectively, and the weekend was marketed as Ford Championship Weekend. The Xfinity Series (then known as the Busch Series) had held its season-ending races at Homestead from 1995 until 2020.

Championship drivers
Jimmie Johnson was the first of the four drivers to clinch a spot in the Championship 4, winning the first race of the Round of 8 at Martinsville.

Carl Edwards clinched the second spot in the Championship 4, winning the second race of the Round of 8 at Texas.

Joey Logano clinched the third spot in the Championship 4, winning the third and final race of the Round of 8 at Phoenix.

Kyle Busch, the defending Cup champion, clinched the final spot, finishing second behind Logano at Phoenix to clinch his spot in the championship race.

Entry list

First practice

Qualifying

He said he was "just so proud of everybody on this Jimmy John’s Chevrolet team. They want to come to the race track and bring good race cars and perform well. Just real proud of that. That’s awesome. I didn’t know if we had a chance at the pole with as fast as the No. 24 (Chase Elliott) had been. But I knew if we could just run the same speed every round, that is half the battle because you never know how much it is going to slow down for everybody else, and it doesn’t take much to make a mistake. Really proud of everybody on our Jimmy John’s team.”

Qualifying results

Practice (post-qualifying)

Second practice

Final practice

Race

First half
Under mostly sunny Florida skies, Kevin Harvick led the field to the green flag at 3:24 p.m. The first caution of the race flew on lap 27 for Ryan Blaney crashing hard into the outside wall in turn 1. Denny Hamlin led a lap under the caution after missing the entrance to pit road. He pitted the next time by and handed the lead back to Harvick.

The race restarted on lap 32. Carl Edwards nudged Harvick in turn 4 to take the lead on lap 33. Harvick took it back on lap 35. A cycle of green flag stops started on lap 68. Harvick pitted from the lead the following lap and handed it to Edwards. He pitted on lap 72 and the lead cycled back to Harvick.

The second caution flew on lap 80 after Jeffrey Earnhardt spun out in turn 4.

The race restarted on lap 86 and Joey Logano beat Harvick to take over the lead. Edwards took the lead on lap 92. Kyle Larson worked his way through the field, catching Carl Edwards and passing him on the outside in turn 4 to take the lead on lap 119 just as another cycle of green flag stops started. Following the cycle, Edwards returned to the lead. A. J. Allmendinger was given a drive-through penalty for an uncontrolled tire.

Second half

Larson retook the lead on lap 126. Kyle Busch made an unscheduled stop for what he thought was a flat right-front tire on lap 137, only to find out a few laps later the tire wasn't flat. Another round of green flag stops commenced on lap 153 and Larson retained the lead through the cycle.

Debris in turn 1 brought out the third caution on lap 171.

The race restarted on lap 171. The fourth caution flew with 61 laps to go for Blaney again crashing hard in turn 1

The race restarted with 55 to go. The fifth caution flew with 15 to go for Dylan Lupton spinning in turn 2.

The race restarted with 10 to go and the sixth caution flew right away for a multi-car wreck in turn 1. On the restart, Edwards went low to block Logano's advance. But in doing so, he came across Logano's nose and got spun into the inside wall. His now destroyed car continued up the track and was lifted into the air after being rear-ended by Kasey Kahne's car. Regan Smith was also collected by the wreck. Logano's car continued, got tapped by Edwards's car and sent into his teammate, Brad Keselowski's car. This sent Brad into the wall along with Ryan Newman. Martin Truex Jr. was also collected and his car burst into flames. It brought out the red flag for 31 minutes and nine seconds. Edwards walked from his wrecked car to the pit box of the 22 team to explain to Todd Gordon (Logano's crew chief) what happened. He said what happened "was just good hard racing, and it was my deal, I own it. I had to block Joey to have any chance at winning the championship. I couldn’t have gone to bed tonight if I had given up that lane to him.” He also told Gordon to "go and get the championship."

The race restarted with five to go and the seventh caution flew for Ricky Stenhouse Jr. getting loose, spinning out in turn 2, turning down the track and hitting the inside wall on the backstretch.

Overtime

The race restarted in overtime with two laps to go. Jimmie Johnson took the lead from Larson coming to the white flag and drove on to score the victory and his seventh Sprint Cup Series championship.

Post-race

Driver comments
After the race, an overwhelmed Johnson said "my gosh, there is no, no way on earth. Just beyond words. Just didn't think the race was unfolding for us like we needed to do to be the champs, but we just kept our heads in the game. Chad called a great strategy, made some great adjustments for the short runs. Luck came our way and we were able to win the race and win the championship. I wouldn't be here without so many people believing in me and giving me this chance. From my dirt days - my parents first and foremost. My brothers. My wife and family today. Car owners, sponsors, Chevrolet, Lowe's, so many amazing people along the way that believed in me to give me this chance. Jeff Gordon, Rick Hendrick, all the men and women at Hendrick Motorsports for working so hard to get these cars fast and giving me an awesome 15 years with the company. Just thank you. From the bottom of my heart. Thank you. So thrilled to be in this moment., So grateful for the opportunity and so thankful and blessed. I am at a loss for words.” He also wasn't shy about wanting to go for an eighth championship, saying he didn't "know what the chances [were], but let's go. I'm so excited to put that in front of myself and the team as a hurdle to get over and an accomplishment to achieve."

Mentor and former teammate Jeff Gordon said he was "just in disbelief the way this race unfolded.…Jimmie wanted that thing. He wanted that seventh championship and he got that seventh championship done. He deserves it. Just an amazing experience."

Teammate Dale Earnhardt Jr., gauging from the largely supportive fan reaction, said he thought "people are coming around [to liking Johnson]. He's always had a great understanding with his people, his fans. Now others are realizing how great he is. I can tell you this. I have no doubt that you can take Jimmie, my dad and Richard Petty and they would have won championships races whenever and wherever they raced. If Jimmie had raced against Dad, Dad wouldn't have won seven championships; and if Dad had raced against Jimmie, he wouldn't have won seven championships. Again, I think people are coming around. I hope so."

Michael McDowell, who earned his fourth career top-10 finish, said "it’s good momentum. Everybody at Circle Sport Leavine Family Racing we’ve been making great progress. Todd Parrott and all the guys at [CSLFR] gave me a great car today. We were up in the top 16-17. A little attrition there at the end, it got crazy. Great restart that last restart, my lane went and snuck out a top-10 pretty cool."

Tony Stewart came home 22nd in his final Sprint Cup Series race. He was as fiery and temperamental as ever in his final start while cursing on his radio channel over a NASCAR-mandated lineup change, saying he "raced. I did what I do every time I get in the car. I didn’t think of anything else other than just racing the race. We got behind there and we tried something to make ground and got caught out and had to run 60 laps on a set of tires. At the end, the line-up there was ... let’s say confusing. I was still screaming about that just like I would on any other race. I was true to my form all the way to the end." Johnson gave Stewart his "Chasing 7" helmet he wore during the race as a parting gift.

Race results

Race summary
 Lead changes: 6 among different drivers
 Cautions/Laps: 7 for 33
 Red flags: 1 for 31 minutes, 9 seconds
 Time of race: 3 hours, 7 minutes, 10 seconds
 Average speed:

Media

Television
NBC covered the race on the television side. Rick Allen, Jeff Burton and Steve Letarte had the call in the booth for the race. Dave Burns, Mike Massaro, Marty Snider and Kelli Stavast handled pit road on the television side. While the race itself aired on NBC, NBCSN aired NBCSN NASCAR Hot Pass, a simultaneous live feed dedicated to each of the Chase drivers, with commentary by Leigh Diffey and Parker Kligerman. Also, three different angles from in-car cameras and a track map tracked the driver's position and changes throughout the field.

Radio
MRN handled the radio call for the race, which was simulcast on Sirius XM NASCAR Radio.

Final season standings

Drivers' Championship standings

Manufacturers' Championship standings

Note: Only the first 16 positions are included for the driver standings.

References

Ford EcoBoost 400
Ford EcoBoost 400
NASCAR races at Homestead-Miami Speedway
Ford EcoBoost 400